Joachim-Ernst Berendt (20 July 1922 in Berlin – 4 February 2000 in Hamburg) was a German music journalist, author and producer specialized on jazz.

Life

Berendt's father, Ernst Berendt, was a Protestant pastor belonging to the Confessing Church who was imprisoned and died in the Dachau concentration camp. J.-E. Berendt started studying Physics, but his studies were interrupted by his enlistment to the Wehrmacht. Already during the Nazi Germany years Berendt took an interest in jazz; enthusiasts in this period retreated to the underground.

After World War II, he helped founding the Südwestfunk (SWF) radio network in the then French occupation zone of Germany. From 1950 until his retirement in 1987, he was in charge of the jazz department of the SWF.

In 1952, the first German edition of Berendt's Jazz Book was published. It became a definitive book on jazz translated into many languages and is still being updated and reprinted. For almost 40 years, Berendt produced the jazz program of the Baden-Baden station of the German public radio and TV network ARD. His weekly TV show Jazztime Baden-Baden and his daily radio shows were pioneer work in promoting jazz in post-war Germany. Berendt later focused on world music and was one of its early promoters, founding a World Music Festival in 1965.

Berendt initiated and organized many jazz festivals (American Folk Blues Festival, Berliner Jazztage, World Expo Osaka). He was the producer of many records, mainly for MPS Records, and supported the Jazz & Lyrik project, combining jazz performances with readings of poetry (not jazz poetry).

Berendt was awarded, amongst others, the critic's award of German television, the culture award of Poland, and twice the Bundesfilmpreis.

Berendt died on 4 February 2000 at the age of 77 after a traffic accident which he was involved in as a pedestrian. The accident happened in Hamburg, Berendt was on his way to a book promotion for his book Es gibt keinen Weg nur Gehen (There Is No Way, Only Going).

Berendt's huge collection of records, books, magazines, photos and more is in the archive of the Jazzinstitut Darmstadt.

Later work
In 1983, Berendt published The World Is Sound: Nada Brahma and The Third Ear: On Listening to the World. In these books Berendt investigates in listening in general, i.e. its medical, historical, physical, cultural and philosophical aspects.

This turn to philosophy also saw him becoming a disciple of the Indian mystic Osho.

Works (selection)
 "Jazz: A Photo History." (Translated by William Odom), Schirmer Books 1979, .
Joachim-Ernst Berendt reads Rainer Maria Rilke "Seelenlandschaften" (Landscapes of the Soul), with music from Philip Catherine, Krzysztof Zgraja, Vladislav Sendecki; Producer: ℗1998 Horst Bösing ©2003 Jaro 4267-2

Bibliography
 The Jazz Book, Lawrence Hill & Company, New York
 The World Is Sound: Nada Brahma: Music and the Landscape of Consciousness, Inner Traditions
 The Third Ear: On Listening to the World
Klangräume (1996)
 The Return of Jazz: Joachim-Ernst Berendt and West German Cultural Change, Andrew Wright Hurley, Berghahn Books (2011)

See also
 Karl Lippegaus

References

External links
 
Obituary from Der Journalist

Jazz & Lyrik 

1922 births
2000 deaths
German male journalists
German music journalists
German music critics
German record producers
German radio personalities
Jazz writers
German radio producers
Officers Crosses of the Order of Merit of the Federal Republic of Germany
Jazz record producers
German male writers
Rajneesh movement
20th-century German journalists
German military personnel of World War II